Filippovskoye is a rural locality (a selo) and the administrative center of Filippovskoye Rural Settlement, Kirzhachsky District, Vladimir Oblast, Russia. The population was 644 as of 2010. There are 38 streets.

Geography 
Filippovskoye is located 21 km southwest of Kirzhach (the district's administrative centre) by road. Alenino is the nearest rural locality.

References 

Rural localities in Kirzhachsky District